Westcot is a hamlet in the civil parish of Sparsholt, about  west of Wantage in the Vale of White Horse, England.

External links
The Sparsholt & Westcot Community Site

Villages in Oxfordshire
Vale of White Horse